Rugby union in Bahrain is a minor but growing sport.

Governing body
The Bahrain Rugby Football Union is the national governing body, under the Arabian Gulf RFU. By the end of 2010, the AGRFU will be broken up, with new unions to be established in each member country, as announced in January 2009 by the IRB. The first national union to be formed from the AGRFU is expected to be that of the UAE.

History
Bahraini rugby is frequently played in high temperatures, and much of the time on sand. Beach rugby and rugby sevens are also popular. Up until the mid-1980s, the only grass rugby pitch in the country was next to the airport, and games were could be interrupted by the comings and goings of the aircraft. 

The sport was reintroduced by Commonwealth ex-patriates working in the oil industry, and they continue to 
dominate the game. For example, the ARGFU website continues to be in English only. A problem is the drinking culture of rugby, which discourages Muslims from taking up the sport.

Bahrain also has a national sevens team.

See also
 Rugby union in the Arab states of the Persian Gulf

References
 Bath, Richard (ed.) The Complete Book of Rugby (Seven Oaks Ltd, 1997 )
 Cotton, Fran (Ed.) (1984) The Book of Rugby Disasters & Bizarre Records. Compiled by Chris Rhys. London. Century Publishing.

External links
 "Islam and Rugby" on the Rugby Readers review